The Ministry of Aerospace Industry of the People's Republic of China was a government ministry responsible for its national space program. This ministry was split into the China National Space Administration and China Aerospace Science and Technology Corporation in July 1993 as a part of government reforms and modernization efforts.

See also
Ministry of Astronautics Industry of the People's Republic of China
China Aerospace Science and Technology Corporation
China Aerospace Science and Industry Corporation

References 

Space program of the People's Republic of China
Defunct government departments of China